The Meanest of Times is the sixth studio album by Dropkick Murphys. It was released on September 18, 2007, by their new vanity label, Born & Bred Records, a division of Cooking Vinyl Records. Their previous albums were released by Hellcat Records. The album was the last to feature guitarist Marc Orrell, who left the band following the tour in support of the album.

The picture on the album's cover was taken at Saint Brendan School in Dorchester, Massachusetts, close to Quincy, Massachusetts whence the band hails. Local kids posed in the picture.

The first songs from the album were heard through the band's MySpace page starting in August 2007. The first track to appear was "(F)lannigan's Ball", which was actually a different version than what is featured on the album, as it featured vocals by Al Barr and Ken Casey rather than Ronnie Drew and Spider Stacy.

On the U.S. Billboard 200 chart, the album debuted at number 20, selling about 28,000 copies in its first week. This album was #49 on Rolling Stones list of the Top 50 Albums of 2007. The album's first single, "The State of Massachusetts", became one of the 100-most-played songs on US modern rock radio in October 2007. Also in October, the song had been added to the playlists of 18 US alternative rock stations.  By January 2008, the song had become one of the 60-most-played alternative rock songs in the United States. This song was #83 on Rolling Stones list of the 100 Best Songs of 2007.

"The State of Massachusetts" is available for download in a special Indie rock pack on Guitar Hero II. "Famous for Nothing", "(F)Lanningan's Ball", and "Johnny, I Hardly Knew Ya" were available as a three-song track pack on Guitar Hero III: Legends of Rock to celebrate Saint Patrick's Day but is no longer available for download.

Songs
The songs "(F)lannigan's Ball", "Fairmount Hill" and "Johnny, I Hardly Knew Ya" are based on traditional Irish tunes. The lyrics of both "(F)lannigan's Ball" (based on "Lanigan's Ball") and "Fairmount Hill" (based on "Spancil Hill") were altered. They include multiple references to places in the Boston region and people associated with the band.

"(F)lannigan's Ball" was partially recorded in the Westland Studios in Dublin and features guest vocals by Ronnie Drew from The Dubliners and Spider Stacy from The Pogues, two of the most iconic figures in the history of Irish folk music and Folk punk, respectively. The song is dedicated to Drew's wife Deirdre, who had died one month before it was recorded. It was also the last song Ronnie Drew made a contribution to before he died on 16 August 2008 at the age of 73, following a long illness.

The band shot a promotional music video in 2008 for the song, "Tomorrow's Industry" which supported the United Healthcare Workers East and hospitals of Massachusetts who were fighting for free and fair union elections so their voice could be heard in the workplace and would provide a better future for their families and communities.

Versions
Multiple versions of the album were released, across different mediums and regions.  All versions feature the same initial 15 tracks, but have different bonus tracks. The European version includes a cover of the Thin Lizzy song  "Jailbreak". A deluxe vinyl edition, which features the album spread out over two 12" records, includes two bonus tracks, "Promised Land" and a cover of The Who song "Baba O'Riley". The vinyl release also includes the album on CD, but the CD only includes the first 15 tracks. The deluxe edition of the iTunes Store release includes three bonus tracks, "Forever" (acoustic version), "The Thick Skin of Defiance" and "Breakdown". The bonus tracks from the iTunes release are also available on "The State of Massachusetts" EP that was released in the UK in February 2008.

A limited edition version of the album was released on March 11, 2008. It includes 5 bonus tracks (including the European bonus track, all three iTunes bonus tracks as well as the original version of "(F)lannigan's Ball" as well as a DVD featuring the music video for "The State of Massachusetts" along with the making of the video, clips of the band's St. Patrick's Day performance along with other behind the scene footage.

Reception

The Meanest of Times generally received positive reviews. Allmusic said that the album was the "tightest and most developed set of songs yet" from the band, and while the Boston Globe said that it fell short of The Warrior's Code, The Meanest of Times was still "everything you want in a Murphys record."  AbsolutePunk's review also said that The Meanest of Times was "not nearly the best they've ever done," but that it was still "well above-average."

It was awarded a silver certification from the Independent Music Companies Association which indicated sales of at least 30,000 copies throughout Europe.

Track listing

Personnel

Dropkick Murphys
Al Barr – vocals
Tim Brennan – mandolin, tin whistle, acoustic guitar
Ken Casey – bass, vocals
Matt Kelly – drums, bodhrán, vocals
James Lynch – guitar, vocals
Marc Orrell – guitar, accordion, vocals
Josh "Scruffy" Wallace – bagpipes

Additional personnel
Spider Stacy – vocals on "(F)lannigan's Ball"
Ronnie Drew – vocals on "(F)lannigan's Ball"
Rick Barton – additional guitar on "The State of Massachusetts"
John Kingsley – Violin
Halley Feaster – Cello, String Arrangements

References

External links
 Photos from the Flannigan's Ball recording sessions
 

Dropkick Murphys albums
2007 albums